Scarleth Elizabeth Mercado Lopez (born ) is a Nicaraguan female weightlifter, competing in the 53 kg category and representing Nicaragua at international competitions. 

She competed at world championships, including at the 2015 World Weightlifting Championships, and 2016 Summer Olympics.

Major results

References

External links

1996 births
Living people
Nicaraguan female weightlifters
Place of birth missing (living people)
Olympic weightlifters of Nicaragua
Weightlifters at the 2016 Summer Olympics